Sphaeropteris brunoniana,  synonym Cyathea brunoniana, is a fern in the family Cyatheaceae.

References

brunoniana